In enzymology, a glucuronoxylan 4-O-methyltransferase is an enzyme that catalyzes the chemical reaction

S-adenosyl-L-methionine + glucuronoxylan D-glucuronate  S-adenosyl-L-homocysteine + glucuronoxylan 4-O-methyl-D-glucuronate

Thus, the two substrates of this enzyme are S-adenosyl methionine and glucuronoxylan D-glucuronate, whereas its two products are S-adenosylhomocysteine and glucuronoxylan 4-O-methyl-D-glucuronate.

This enzyme belongs to the family of transferases, specifically those transferring one-carbon group methyltransferases.  The systematic name of this enzyme class is S-adenosyl-L-methionine:glucuronoxylan-D-glucuronate 4-O-methyltransferase.

References

 

EC 2.1.1
Enzymes of unknown structure